Dry as a Bone/Rehab Doll is a compilation album by the American rock band Green River. It was released on September 13, 1990 through Sub Pop Records.

Overview
Released in 1990 by Sub Pop Records, the album combines Green River's two releases for the label: Dry as a Bone (1987) and Rehab Doll (1988). It also includes the bonus tracks "Ain't Nothing to Do" (recorded in 1985), "Searchin'" (recorded in 1986), and "Queen Bitch" (recorded in 1987). Steve Huey of AllMusic said, "Since Dry as a Bone/Rehab Doll is more energetic and less murky than many proto-grunge artifacts, it's arguably the most effective and enduring building block in the music's early evolution."

Track listing
All songs written by Jeff Ament, Mark Arm, Bruce Fairweather, Stone Gossard, and Alex Vincent, except where noted:

Recorded for Dry as a Bone:
"This Town" – 3:23
"P.C.C." – 3:44
"Ozzie" (Tales of Terror) – 3:11
"Unwind" – 4:42
"Baby Takes" – 4:24
"Searchin'" – 3:48
Recorded in March 1985:
"Ain't Nothing to Do" (Stiv Bators, Cheetah Chrome) – 2:38
Recorded for Rehab Doll:
"Queen Bitch" (David Bowie) – 2:58
"Forever Means" – 4:20
"Rehab Doll" (Arm, Paul Solger) – 3:23
"Swallow My Pride" (Arm, Steve Turner) – 2:59
"Together We'll Never" – 4:01
"Smilin' and Dyin'" – 3:23
"Porkfist" – 3:13
"Take a Dive" – 3:28
"One More Stitch" – 3:53

Personnel
Green River
Jeff Ament – bass guitar, vocals
Mark Arm – vocals
Bruce Fairweather – guitars
Stone Gossard – guitars, vocals
Alex Vincent – drums, percussion

Production
Bruce Calder, Jack Endino – production
Jane Higgins – layout
Linda Owens – original album cover layout
Charles Peterson – photos, layout

References

1990 compilation albums
Green River (band) albums
Grunge compilation albums
Sub Pop compilation albums